Herald Scholarly Open Access is a publisher of various academic journals. It has a postal address in Herndon, Virginia, United States, but is actually based in Hyderabad, India.
Herald Scholarly Open Access has been included on Beall's List of potential predatory open-access publishers, and has faced other criticisms of its publishing practices.

Activities 
Herald Scholarly Open Access has been active at least since 2015. The company uses an Open Access model of publishing, which charges the authors. Articles are distributed online and free of cost or other barriers. The company claims that articles are peer reviewed before publication. In 2022, the company published about 73 journals in the fields of clinical and medical science, life sciences, and pharma. Of the first 10 journals listed by the company in July 2022, eight did not have a scientific editor-in-chief. Its journals are not indexed in Medline, Scopus or Web of Science.

Criticism 
Herald Scholarly Open Access was listed in Beall's List of potential predatory open-access publishers. The company has been criticized for sending out email spam to scientists, calling out for papers, and for choosing journal titles mimicking the titles of established, indexed journals.

Journals

References

Academic publishing companies
Open access publishers
Companies based in Hyderabad, India